Leucadendron barkerae, the Swartberg conebush, is a flower-bearing shrub that belongs to the genus Leucadendron and forms part of the fynbos. The plant is native to the Western Cape, South Africa.

Description

Distribution and habitat
The plant occurs in the Bonteberg to Witteberg, Swartberg, Waboomsberg, and Koo at the Langeberg.

Gallery

References

Threatened Species Programme | SANBI Red List of South African Plants
Leucadendron barkerae (Swartberg conebush)
Swartberg Conebush

barkerae